Thunderstone is a power metal band from Helsinki, Finland. The band was formed in 2000 by guitarist Nino Laurenne and the line-up became complete in the following year. After the release of the band's self-titled debut album, Thunderstone, the band toured Europe supporting Stratovarius and Symphony X. Thunderstone released its first four albums through Nuclear Blast; however, their album Dirt Metal was released in October 2009 under Sony Music label.

History

Thunderstone was formed in early 2000 by ex-speed/thrash Antidote guitarist Nino Laurenne as a project; his first demo was recorded at Sonic Pump Studios. With a growing awareness of the project's potential, a commitment was made to create a full-fledged band. Laurenne then recruited former Antidote bandmate Titus Hjelm on bass and backing vocals, Pasi Rantanen on vocals, and Mirka Rantanen on drums. By the summer of 2001, Kari Tornack joined the band as a keyboardist, and Thunderstone evolved into a quintet. 

Thunderstone released their self-titled debut in 2002. Recorded at Sonic Pump Studios in Helsinki (with Laurenne as guitarist, producer, and engineer) and mixed by Mikko Karmila (Children Of Bodom, Amorphis) at Finnvox Studios (Sentenced, Moonspell, Stratovarius), Thunderstone ended the year with a strong presence on numerous year-end "Top Metal Albums Of 2002" lists. In 2003, after being named "Newcomer of the Year" by the readers of Rock Hard Magazine, Thunderstone celebrated their accomplishments with an extensive European tour supporting Stratovarius and Symphony X.

Thunderstone returned to Sonic Pump to record their second album, The Burning. Among many accolades the album received (such as the appearance of their promotional video for "Until We Touch The Burning Sun" on Finnish television), the album rose to No. 13 on the official Finnish album chart.

The band entered the studio again in late 2004 and started work on their third album Tools Of Destruction. The album once again recorded at Sonic Pump Studios. The opening track, "Tool Of The Devil," went straight to No. 3 on the Finnish Singles Chart. Gigs in Finland and the first headlining European tour with label mates Crystal Ball followed.

The band returned yet again to the studio to record their fourth album in the fall of 2006. The same year also witnessed the bands first appearance in the USA. In October the band was invited to take part in the Finnish Eurovision Song Contest. The band was voted second, losing only narrowly to Finnish Idol Hanna Pakarinen. The Eurovision fame resulted in the release of two singles, 10.000 Ways and Forevermore/Face in the Mirror, which both went straight to the top 3 in the Finnish single charts. Finally, the efforts of the previous studio sessions came to fruition when Thunderstone’s fourth studio album Evolution 4.0 was released in March 2007. Showing a darker side of the band and moving them away from the “power metal” of their first release, the album was liked by the fans and entered the Finnish charts at No. 10. Again, a Finnish tour and summer festivals followed.

Late in 2007 the band posted this statement on their official website:

"We are sad to announce that Pasi Rantanen and Kari Tornack are no
longer part of Thunderstone. Due to personal reasons and a visible
lack of motivation on their part we saw it best to part with the
guys, although the decision was not easy and the timing perhaps the
worst possible. Everything was done in good spirits and we thank the
guys for an unbelievably great and fun seven years and wish them all
the best in their private endeavors.

However, the first priority for us was not to let our fans down even
in a situation like this. Therefore, we will go on with the upcoming
co-headlining tour with Nocturnal Rites as planned. And we are most
proud to announce two incredible musicians who agreed to fill in for
the tour on such a short notice. On keyboards we will have none other
than legendary JENS JOHANSSON, the crazy Swede and a long-time friend
from Stratovarius. The vocal duties will be handled by the incredible-
sounding TOMMI 'TUPLE' SALMELA who in recent years has shared the
vocals with Marco Hietala in the classic Finnish metal outfit Tarot.
As you can probably imagine, we are more than thrilled to have these
guys on board. Book your tickets NOW!!!"

Jens Johansson was unable to make it to the tour, but Status Minor keyboardist Jukka Karinen was able to fill in, and was ultimately asked to join the band before the tour even began.

In 2009, Thunderstone released their fifth album, Dirt Metal. Around this time, Mirka Rantanen founded the side project band Hevisaurus, which has seen heavy media coverage as a children's music band that plays heavy metal.

In late July/early August 2013, Thunderstone's official Facebook page made several announcements, including that both singer Rick Altzi and drummer Mirka Rantanen would be parting ways with the band. The last of the notices announced the return of Pasi Rantanen on vocals.

In early February 2014, band announced on their official Facebook page, that their new drummer is Atte Palokangas (Agonizer, Before the Dawn)

Eurovision
Thunderstone were in the Finnish preselection final round for Eurovision 2007, with their song "Forevermore". They were placed second with 33% of the given votes.

Members
 Pasi Rantanen - lead vocals (2000-2007, 2013-onwards)
 Nino Laurenne- guitar, backing vocal
 Titus Hjelm - bass, backing vocal
 Jukka Karinen- keyboards
 Atte Palokangas - drums

Former members
 Rick Altzi - lead vocals (2008-2013)
 Mirka "Leka" Rantanen - drums
 Kari Tornack - keyboards (2001–2007)

Discography
Demo
 Demo (2001)

Studio albums
Thunderstone (2002)
The Burning (2004)
Tools of Destruction (2005)
Evolution 4.0 (2007)
Dirt Metal (2009)
Apocalypse Again (2016)

Compilation
All the Best (2011)

Singles
 "Virus" (2002)
 "Tool Of The Devil" (2005)
 "10.000 Ways" (2007)
 "Forevermore" / "Face In The Mirror" (2007)
 "I Almighty" (2009)
 "Veterans Of The Apocalypse" (2016)
 "Virus 2020" (2020)

Music videos
"Virus" (First version) (2002)
"Until We Touch The Burning Sun" (2004)
"Tool Of The Devil" (2005)
"Face In The Mirror" (2007)
"I Almighty" (2009)
"Veterans Of The Apocalypse" (Lyric Video) [2016]
"The Path" (2016)
"Fire And Ice" (2016)
"Through The Pain" (2016)
 "Virus" (Second version) (2020)

References

External links
 Official website
 
 

Musical groups established in 2000
Finnish power metal musical groups
Nuclear Blast artists